Sike Khaung or Sai Khao is a village in Hsi Hseng Township, Taunggyi District, Pa'O Self-Administered Zone, in the Shan State of eastern Myanmar. It is located north of the township capital of Hsi Hseng by National Highway 5. Nawnge and Lothkan are located to the west, Loimut to the southeast, and Hsohsa to the northeast.

References

External links
Maplandia World Gazetteer

Populated places in Taunggyi District
Hsi Hseng Township